Koudougou is a department or commune of Boulkiemdé Province in central Burkina Faso. As of 2019 it has a population of 216,774. Its capital is the town of Koudougou.

Towns and villages
KoudougouBoulsinDoulouGningaGodin-OualogtingaKamedjiKikigogo
KolgrogogoLattouNayalguéPéyiriSariaSigoghinToêgaTiogo MossiVilly

References

Departments of Burkina Faso
Boulkiemdé Province